Buberl is a surname. Notable people with the surname include:

Caspar Buberl (1834–1899), American sculptor
Thomas Buberl (born 1973), German businessman

See also
Buber